Giulio Caporali (Perugia, active 1540) was an Italian painter and architect of the Renaissance.

He was the son and pupil of Giovanni Battista, also known as Bitti and perhaps erroneously as Benedetto, and who was a painter at Perugia, and a pupil of Perugino. Giulio was an architect of the Panicale Cathedral.

References

Year of birth missing
Year of death missing
People from Perugia
16th-century Italian painters
Italian male painters
16th-century Italian architects
Italian Renaissance architects
Architects from Umbria
Umbrian painters
Italian Renaissance painters